Pieczonogi  is a village in the administrative district of Gmina Oleśnica, within Staszów County, Świętokrzyskie Voivodeship, in south-central Poland.

The village has a population of  433.

Demography 
According to the 2002 Poland census, there were 432 people residing in Pieczonogi village, of whom 48.1% were male and 51.9% were female. In the village, the population was spread out, with 22% under the age of 18, 39.6% from 18 to 44, 18.1% from 45 to 64, and 20.1% who were 65 years of age or older.
 Figure 1. Population pyramid of village in 2002 — by age group and sex

References

Villages in Staszów County